Elena Juricich-Sandler (born 6 September 1979) is a Uruguayan former professional tennis player.

Juricich represented the Uruguay Fed Cup team in a total of 14 ties, between 1994 and 1998. Playing on the professional tour, she reached a best singles ranking of 429 in the world and won two ITF doubles titles.

ITF finals

Doubles: 6 (2–4)

References

External links
 
 
 

1979 births
Living people
Uruguayan female tennis players
20th-century Uruguayan women
21st-century Uruguayan women